"My City of Ruins" is a popular 2000s song written and performed by Bruce Springsteen and included on his 2002 album The Rising. It was released as a single in New Zealand in 2011, charting at #17.

History
The song was written in November 2000, for an Asbury Park, New Jersey Christmas show benefit to help promote the revitalization of the city. Once a popular resort destination in the late 19th and early 20th centuries, Asbury Park had succumbed to significant amounts of blight for a variety of reasons, including the ill-effects of the Great Depression, the opening of the Garden State Parkway, and race riots.

The song first starts describing the current state of Asbury Park, the deterioration, and the absence of people in the area.

Throughout the song, Springsteen continues to describe the city using images such as men loitering on a street corner and buildings with boarded-up windows:

The song ends, however, on a hopeful and optimistic note by powerfully imploring the city to "rise up" from the decay:

"My City of Ruins" was first played on December 17, 2000, at Asbury Park Convention Hall.

September 11 association
The song took on a new meaning soon after the September 11 attacks, offering a message of hope and rising from the ruins.  The most famous live performance of the song came on September 21, 2001, during the America: A Tribute to Heroes national telethon. With only a guitar and a harmonica, Springsteen opened the program, introducing the number as "a prayer for our fallen brothers and sisters" and modifying a few phrases in the song.  He was joined on stage by Patti Scialfa, Steven Van Zandt, Soozie Tyrell, Lisa Lowell and Clarence Clemons.  It was included as the first track on the subsequent album released of the telethon performances.

A studio recording of "My City of Ruins" was then incorporated as the concluding track of Springsteen's September 11-themed, July 2002 album release The Rising.

Christchurch, New Zealand earthquake
The song was widely used by New Zealand television stations during coverage of the February 2011 Christchurch earthquake, and became an unofficial anthem of the city in the weeks and months that followed. It inspired people of the city to rise up and rebuild the city, an endeavour which is now in progress. Springsteen played the song and dedicated it to the city during a concert in the city on the sixth anniversary of the earthquake, during his 2017 tour of Australia and New Zealand.

Subsequent live performance history
"My City of Ruins" was included on the Live in Barcelona concert video and as a PBS special edition EP bonus track on Bruce Springsteen with The Sessions Band: Live in Dublin.

After a tour of the devastation wrought by Hurricane Katrina, Springsteen played the song at the 2006 New Orleans Jazz & Heritage Festival.

During the Working on a Dream Tour date in Rome, in July 2009, Springsteen dedicated this song to the victims of the earthquake which had devastated the Italian city of l'Aquila a few months before.

The song was dedicated to the Jersey Shore on November 1, 2012, at Pennsylvania State University (a stop on the Wrecking Ball Tour) after Hurricane Sandy and was performed on December 12, 2012, at the Concert for Sandy Relief.

Notable covers
Eddie Vedder performed the song at the 32nd Annual Kennedy Center Honors as part of the multi-artist tribute to Bruce Springsteen, who was one of five recipients of the honor in 2009. In January 2010, pearljam.com announced that Vedder's cover of the song would be available on iTunes to raise funds for Haiti earthquake disaster relief efforts. The song entered the Hot 100 the following month, peaking at #92.

References

External links 
 Lyrics & Audio clips from Brucespringsteen.net

Bruce Springsteen songs
2000 songs
Songs written by Bruce Springsteen
Song recordings produced by Brendan O'Brien (record producer)